David Rostislavich (Cyrillic: Давыд Ростиславич) (1140 - 23 April 1197), Prince of Smolensk (1180–1198) was fourth son of Rostislav Mstislavich, Velikiy Kniaz (Grand Prince) of Kiev.

David was born in 1140, Smolensk, in a family of Rostislav Mstislavich, Prince of Smolensk. During 1167, David received in his rule Vyshhorod. In 1171, David was trying to put Vladimir III Mstislavich to a tron, and in a next year his brother Rurik Rostislavich. In 1175, he together with Prince Oleg Svyatoslavich, was fighting in Chernigov and in next year lost battle with Cumans near city of Rostovec. This battle mentioned in The Tale of Igor's Campaign.

Sources
 The Chronicle of Novgorod PDF file

1197 deaths
Rurik dynasty
Princes of Smolensk
12th-century princes in Kievan Rus'
Eastern Orthodox monarchs
1140 births
Davyd